Kurt Eklund (born 5 January 1992 in New Zealand) is a New Zealand rugby union player who plays for the  in Super Rugby. His playing position is hooker. He has signed for the Blues squad in 2020.

Reference list

External links

1992 births
New Zealand rugby union players
Living people
Rugby union hookers
Auckland rugby union players
Bay of Plenty rugby union players
Blues (Super Rugby) players
Māori All Blacks players